The Dreyfus model of skill acquisition is a model of how learners acquire skills through formal instruction and practicing, used in the fields of education and operations research. Brothers Stuart and Hubert Dreyfus proposed the model in 1980 in an 18-page report on their research at the University of California, Berkeley, Operations Research Center for the United States Air Force Office of Scientific Research. The model proposes that a student passes through five distinct stages and was originally determined as: novice, competence, proficiency, expertise, and mastery.

Dreyfus model
The Dreyfus model is based on four binary qualities: 
 Recollection (non-situational or situational)
 Recognition (decomposed or holistic)
 Decision (analytical or intuitive)
 Awareness (monitoring or absorbed)

The original model included mastery as the last stage, in their book Mind over Machine, this was slightly adjusted to end with Expertise. This leads to the full five stage process:

Criticism of the model
A criticism of Dreyfus and Dreyfus's model has been provided by Gobet and Chassy, who also propose an alternative theory of intuition. According to these authors, there is no empirical evidence for the presence of stages in the development of expertise. In addition, while the model argues that analytic thinking does not play any role with experts, who act only intuitively, there is much evidence that experts in fact often carry out relatively slow problem solving (e.g. look-ahead search in chess).

However, the above criticisms are based on a partial reading of the published record. For example, the criticisms fail to take into account the notion of the “deliberative rationality” of experts, which is a kind of expert reflection in action, as developed in Dreyfus and Dreyfus, Mind Over Machine.

In turn, the challenge posed by look-ahead search in chess is addressed within the scope of the skill model in a 1982 article by Stuart Dreyfus. With respect to the question of experts calculating into the future, Dreyfus argues that chess is not a suitable example from which to generalize about skillful action at large: “The DeGroot reference to the well-known practice of the chess player of calculating out into the future should not be interpreted as evidence that skilled decision-makers in other domains do likewise. This examination of possible futures becomes feasible in chess because the objective and complete nature of a chess position makes a future position as intuitively meaningful as a present one”(p.151).

See also
 Dreyfus' critique of artificial intelligence
 Chris Argyris' concepts of Action learning
 Four stages of competence
 Skill
 Shu Ha Ri
 Merleau Ponty
 Language proficiency, particularly ACTFL Proficiency Guidelines
 Bloom's taxonomy

References

Further reading

External links 
 The seven stages of expertise in Software engineering

Skills
Learning
Learning theory (education)
Stage theories